The Moving Finger is a 1963 American film.

Premise
A bank robber takes refuge with some bohemians.

Cast
Lionel Stander
Barbara London
Wendy Barrie
Art Smith
Barbara Loden

Production
It was a comedy filmed with money from private sources and took 16 months to shoot. The working title was Better Than Money.

References

External links 
The Moving Finger at BFI
The Moving Finger at IMDB
The Moving Finger at Letterbox DVD
Review of film at Shock Cinema Magazine
1963 films
1960s English-language films
1960s American films